The 2013–14 Northwestern State Demons basketball team represented Northwestern State University during the 2013–14 NCAA Division I men's basketball season. The Demons, led by 15th year head coach Mike McConathy, played their home games at Prather Coliseum and were members of the Southland Conference. They finished the season 17–4, 12–6 in Southland play to finish in fourth place. They advanced to the semifinals of the Southland Conference tournament where they lost to Stephen F. Austin.

Roster

Radio
Most games will be carried live on the Demon Sports Radio Network. There are three affiliates for the Demon Sports Radio Network.
KZBL (Flagship)
KSYR
KTEZ

Schedule

|-
!colspan=9 style="background:#660099; color:#FF6600;"| Regular season

|-
!colspan=9 style="background:#660099; color:#FF6600;"| Southland tournament

See also
2013–14 Northwestern State Lady Demons basketball team

References

Northwestern State
Northwestern State Demons basketball seasons
2013 in sports in Louisiana
2014 in sports in Louisiana